Leslie Prince Raimond (born December 6, 1940) is Director Emeritus, Kent Cultural Alliance (formerly known as Kent County Arts Council) in Chestertown, MD.

She and her husband, Vincent Martin Raimond, worked hand-in-hand for over 45 years to create a thriving and inclusive arts and culture community. In 2005 they were the inaugural recipients of the annual Kenny Award, created by the Hedgelawn Foundation. The Vincent and Leslie Prince Raimond Cultural Center, named in honor and recognition of their collective 40 years plus of service to the people of Kent County through the arts, is slated to open in 2021. It is in the renovated, historic Mansfield/Eliasson house located at 101 Spring Avenue in Chestertown.

Early life and family 
Leslie Prince Raimond is the daughter of Charles Lempreire Prince, a cotton broker, and Louisa Grace Prince, the "Rock and Roll Den Mother." Her sister Helen Hannay Prince (1942  - 2015) was a biologist who worked with James Watson and Stanley B. Prusiner. Her brother is Prairie Prince, The Tubes drummer and an artist. Her family relocated to Phoenix, Arizona from Laurinburg, North Carolina, in 1950. She moved to Chestertown, MD in 1960 to attend Washington College. She holds a Bachelor of Arts in English ('63) and a Master of Arts in English ('93) from Washington College.

She married Vincent Martin Raimond (June 20, 1922 - August 12, 2014) in 1967. They have three children; Morgan, Francesca, and Daniel.

Career 
After graduating with a Bachelor of Arts in English and a teaching degree in 1963, she was an English teacher at Galena High School on the Eastern Shore of Maryland. She introduced students to Joan Baez and Bob Dylan in poetry class. She taught kids and adults ballet, creative movement, ballroom dance and theater/drama group classes. For 25 year, she hosted "The Eclectic Leslie" a weekly radio show at WKHS 90.5 FM. The format ranged from be-bop to hip-hop, from Coltrane to Soul Train.

The Kent County Arts Council was founded in 1975 by Vincent Raimond. In 1984, Vince and Leslie Raimond founded Actors Community Theater (ACT) and produced over 100 productions. Leslie Prince Raimond led the Kent County Arts Council from 1989 to 2017 and was instrumental in supporting many aspects of the arts in the county including First Fridays, Riverside Blues Festival, Chestertown Jazz Festival, Art Shows, Music in the Park and establishing an Arts and Entertainment District in Chestertown.

Her involvement with the Kent County Senior Center gave her a deep insight and opportunity to become more aware of the African American communities. She became deeply involved in producing musical events such as the 100 Voice Choir. She produced recordings of local talented gospel singers.

To further this involvement, while Executive Director of the Kent County Arts Council, she facilitated the restoration of a historic fraternal lodge Charles Sumner Post No.25, Grand Army of the Republic, now known as Sumner Hall. It is one of only two Grand Army of the Republic halls for African-American veterans known to survive in the Nation.

The difficult first steps of stabilizing the historic building had been accomplished by Preservation, Inc. The Arts Council worked closely with Town, County, State and National agencies, and local volunteers to complete the project. Sumner Hall had a grand opening on Juneteenth 2014. It holds events which celebrate and commemorate the heritage of African Americans past and present.

References

External links
 Kent Cultural Alliance
 Sumner Hall

1940 births
Living people
People from Chestertown, Maryland
People from Laurinburg, North Carolina